Žiga Samar (born January 26, 2001) is a Slovenian professional basketball player for Hamburg Towers of the Basketball Bundesliga (BBL), on loan from Alba Berlin. He is a 1.97m tall point guard.

Professional career
Samar made his professional debut for Real Madrid B in the Liga EBA during the 2017–18 season.

On August 19, 2019, Samar signed a four-year contract with Spanish team Fuenlabrada. For the 2019–20 season he was loaned to Zamora of the LEB Plata.

On July 22, 2022, he has signed with Alba Berlin of the Basketball Bundesliga (BBL). On August 5, 2022, Samar joined fellow Bundesliga side Hamburg Towers on loan.

References

External links
 Eurobasket.com profile
 REALGM profile
 PROBALLERS profile

2001 births
Living people
Baloncesto Fuenlabrada players
Hamburg Towers players
Liga ACB players
Point guards
Slovenian expatriate basketball people in Spain
Slovenian men's basketball players
Sportspeople from Jesenice, Jesenice